Anolis lividus, the Plymouth anole or Montserrat anole, is a species of anole lizard that is endemic to the island of Montserrat in the Caribbean Lesser Antilles.  It is widespread and abundant in many areas.

Individuals vary widely in appearance.  Males can be grass-green or yellow-green, and may be plain or with lighter blue speckling towards the anterior, and a rust-red tint over the head and limbs.  Others are olive-green or gray, with widespread pale spots.  Males in populations on the northern end of the island have prominent black spots on their necks.  Females are duller and more brown, with a mid-dorsal stripe or ladder pattern and a light flank stripe.

See also
List of amphibians and reptiles of Montserrat
List of Anolis lizards

References

.

External links
Anolis lividus at the Encyclopedia of Life
Anolis lividus at the Reptile Database

L
Lizards of the Caribbean
Endemic fauna of Montserrat
Reptiles of Montserrat
Reptiles described in 1887
Taxa named by Samuel Garman